Air Marshal Sir Thomas Walker Elmhirst,  (15 December 1895 – 6 November 1982) was a senior commander in the Royal Air Force in the first half of the 20th century and the first commander-in-chief of the Royal Indian Air Force upon Indian independence in August 1947, in which post he organised the funeral of Mahatma Gandhi following his assassination in 1948. He later became the Lieutenant-Governor and Commander-in-Chief of Guernsey from 1953 to 1958.

Family
Thomas Elmhirst was born on 15 December 1895 to Reverend William Heaton Elmhirst (b. 1856) and Mary Elmhirst (née Knight; b. 1863), a landed gentry family in Yorkshire, where the family seat is Houndhill. He was the fourth of eight boys and had one younger sister. The children were:
Captain William Elmhirst (1892–1916), killed on 13 November 1916 while serving with the 8th Battalion East Yorkshire Regiment during the Battle of the Somme
Leonard Knight Elmhirst (1893–1974), a noted philanthropist and educational reformer who married Dorothy Payne Whitney
Second Lieutenant Ernest Christopher "Christie" Elmhirst (1895–1915), killed on 7 August 1915 while serving with the 8th Battalion Duke of Wellington's (West Riding Regiment) during the Gallipoli campaign
Thomas Elmhirst (1895–1982)
James Victor Elmhirst (1898–1958)
Richard Elmhirst (b. 1900)
Alfred O. Elmhirst (1901–1995) of Houndhill
Irene Rachel Elmhirst (b. 1902)

Military career
Elmhirst studied at the Royal Naval Colleges at Osborne, Isle of Wight in 1908, and at Dartmouth in Devon.

First World War
In April 1912, Elmhirst joined his first ship, . When war came he served on HMS Indomitable as the ship took part in the initial bombardment of the Turkish Dardanelles forts and the Battle of Dogger Bank, where he commanded 'X Gun Turret', the last one to fire at the German ship  before it sank. In 1915 he was selected to be in the first draft of the Royal Naval Air Service where he served until the end of the First World War. He celebrated the armistice by flying an airship (SSZ73) under the Menai Bridge with his friend Gordon Campbell as his passenger. By 1917, he was promoted to flight lieutenant and by March 1918 to major, commanding the Naval Airship Patrol Station on Anglesey in Wales. He then became part of the newly formed Royal Air Force in 1919.

Between the wars Elmhirst trialled the first gyroscopic compass for aircraft in the RAF and became Air Attaché to Turkey in the run up to the Second World War. In January 1940 returned to the Air Ministry as Deputy Director of Intelligence.

Second World War
During the Second World War Elmhirst ran the operations room at RAF Uxbridge during the Battle of Britain. He then commanded the Egypt Command Group under Air Marshal Tedder before becoming second-in-command of the Desert Air Force. He continued in this role through the battle of Alamein until after the Allied invasion of Sicily. He was then second-in-command of British Air Forces in North West Europe until the end of the war, serving in D-Day, Normandy, the Ardennes and the advance across the France and Germany. Finally he became Assistant Chief of the Air Staff (Intelligence) in August 1945.

Post war
After the war Elmhirst was appointed as the Commander of the RAF in India. As independence approached, Pandit Nehru asked him to be the first Commander-in-Chief of the Royal Indian Air Force in the new Union of India.

In 1953, Elmhirst ran Operation Totem, the first British nuclear bomb land tests in Emu Field, Australia. Later in 1953 he became the Lieutenant-Governor of Guernsey, welcoming Queen Elizabeth II on her inaugural tour of the island as the new monarch. He held the post for five years, retiring in 1958.

Personal life
Elmhirst married firstly Katherine Gordon Black, daughter of William Black, on 16 December 1930, and had two children before Katherine's death in 1965:
Roger Elmhirst (1935–1999)
Caroline Jane Elmhirst (b. 1932), who married Michael Frazer Mackie
On 30 October 1968, he married Marian Ferguson (née Montagu Douglas Scott), widow of Colonel Andrew Henry Ferguson. Marian was the daughter of Lord Herbert Montagu Douglas Scott and Marie Josephine Edwards, and the granddaughter of The 6th Duke of Buccleuch and Lady Louisa Hamilton. From Marian's first marriage, she was the paternal grandmother of Sarah, Duchess of York, and maternal great-grandmother of Princess Beatrice of York and Princess Eugenie of York. Together they lived at Dummer Down House, at Dummer in Basingstoke, Hants, her dower estate from her first marriage.

Thomas Elmhirst died at Dummer, Hampshire, on 6 November 1982, in his 87th year. He was survived by his second wife, and his children and grandchildren from his first marriage.

References

|-

|-

|-

|-

1895 births
1982 deaths
Commanders of the Legion of Merit
Commandeurs of the Légion d'honneur
Companions of the Order of the Bath
Grand Officers of the Order of the Crown (Belgium)
Heads of RAF Intelligence
Knights Commander of the Order of the British Empire
People from Barnsley
Recipients of the Air Force Cross (United Kingdom)
Recipients of the Croix de Guerre 1939–1945 (France)
Recipients of the Croix de guerre (Belgium)
Royal Air Force air marshals of World War II
Royal Naval Air Service aviators
Royal Naval Air Service personnel of World War I
Royal Navy officers
British air attachés
Graduates of Britannia Royal Naval College
People educated at the Royal Naval College, Osborne
Military personnel from Yorkshire
People from Dummer, Hampshire
Chiefs of Air Staff (India)